HMS E19 was an E-class submarine of the Royal Navy, commissioned in 1914 at Vickers, Barrow-in-Furness. During World War I she was part of the British submarine flotilla in the Baltic.

Design
She was powered by two  Vickers eight-cylinder two-stroke diesel engines and two  electric motors.

E19 was probably the first of the E-class to be fitted with a deck gun during construction, in this instance, possibly uniquely, with only a 2-pounder, forward of the conning tower. She had five 18 inch (450 mm) torpedo tubes, two in the bow, one either side amidships, and one in the stern; a total of 10 torpedoes were carried.

E-Class submarines had wireless systems with  power ratings; in some submarines, these were later upgraded to  systems by removing a midship torpedo tube. Their maximum design depth was  although in service some reached depths of below . Some submarines contained Fessenden oscillator systems.

Crew
Her complement was three officers and 28 men.

Service history
Under the command of Lieutenant Commander Francis Cromie, E19 was, in September 1915, the last of five British submarines to manage the passage through the Oresund into the Baltic Sea. She was then able to sink several German ships, most notably on 11 October 1915 when she sank four German freighters just south of Öland within a few hours and without any casualties. 

On 7 November 1915 E19 sank the German light cruiser .

Trivia 
A beer, Slottskällans Vrak, has been brewed using yeast recovered from beer bottles found on the wreck of SS Nicomedia, a ship sunk by E19 off Öland.

References 

 

British E-class submarines of the Royal Navy
Ships built in Barrow-in-Furness
1915 ships
World War I submarines of the United Kingdom
World War I shipwrecks in the Baltic Sea
Lost submarines of the United Kingdom
Royal Navy ship names
Maritime incidents in 1918
Shipwrecks of Finland
Scuttled vessels of the United Kingdom